Collazzone is a comune (municipality) in the Province of Perugia in the Italian region Umbria, located about 25 km south of Perugia. As of 31 December 2004, it had a population of 3,108 and an area of 55.8 km².

The municipality of Collazzone contains the frazioni (subdivisions, mainly villages and hamlets) Assignano, Canalicchio, Casalalta, Collepepe, Gaglietole, and Piedicolle.

Collazzone borders the following municipalities: Bettona, Deruta, Fratta Todina, Gualdo Cattaneo, Marsciano, Todi.

Buildings and monuments of interest
Parish church of San Lorenzo (19th-20th-centuries)
Church of St Michael the Archangel
Franciscan nunnery
Portal in Piazza Jacopone, attributed to Giacomo Vignola
Convent of St Lorenzo: where Jacopone da Todi died in 1306.
Santa Maria Assunta in Collepepe: Romanesque and Gothic architecture church.

References

External links
 Proloco

Cities and towns in Umbria